Junkyard Speed Ball is the fourth full-length album by the Indiana rock band Left Lane Cruiser, released in 2011.

Critical reception
AllMusic called the album "another fine outing from a refreshingly direct and uncomplicated band that rocks like a jackhammer." No Depression called the album "searing," writing that Left Lane Cruiser is "in its prime." Nuvo wrote that the album "runs the gamut between country-blues laments ('Hip-Hop'), hard rocking house party staples ('Weed Vodka') and psychedelic mind blowers ('Pig Farm')."

Track listing

References

2011 albums
Left Lane Cruiser albums
Alive Naturalsound Records albums